Stateline was a television current affairs program produced by the Australian Broadcasting Corporation. It provided analysis of state and municipal politics as well as insight into state and regional issues in a current affairs journalistic style. The program was known for its interviews with politicians, and for its coverage of important regional issues.

The ABC announced in December 2010 that the state-based current affairs program Stateline would be folded into a new 7.30 brand from March 2011. The change saw 7.30 extended to five nights a week, although Friday editions continue to be presented locally and focus on state affairs.

Format

It was broadcast on ABC1 on Fridays at 7:30 pm (in place of The 7.30 Report), with eight separate state and territory specific editions. It was also broadcast on the new digital channel ABC2 after its launch in March 2005.

With the launch of ABC News 24 in 2010, each local version of Stateline was also broadcast nationally on the channel over the weekend.

References

External links
Official site
Stateline at the National Film and Sound Archive

ABC News and Current Affairs
Australian non-fiction television series
1996 Australian television series debuts
2011 Australian television series endings
2000s Australian television series